The 1926 Primera División was the 11th season of top-flight Peruvian football. A total of 11 teams competed in the league, with Sport Progreso successfully defending their national title won in 1921. This was the first season to be organized by the Peruvian Football Federation as the Liga Peruana de Football ceased operations in 1921. Many matches were not played; therefore many teams were relegated and for 1927 the Primera División was reduced to 8 clubs.

Results

Standings

External links
Peru 1926 season at RSSSF
Peruvian Football League News 

Peru
1926
1926 in Peruvian football